Towngas China Company Limited, formerly Panva Gas Holdings Limited, is a natural gas distribution businesses in mainland China. It principally engaged in the sales and distribution of piped gas including the provision of piped gas, construction of 
Gas pipelines, the operation of city-gas pipeline networks, the operation of gas fuel automobile refilling station, and the sale of gas household appliance.

In 2006, Hong Kong and China Gas acquired 44% of shares of Panva Gas and became the largest shareholder of Panva Gas. In 2007, the company was renamed, becoming Towngas China Company Limited.

See also

 Energy in Hong Kong

References

External links 
Towngas China Company Limited

Companies listed on the Hong Kong Stock Exchange
Energy companies established in 2000
Henderson Land Development
Oil and gas companies of Hong Kong
Natural gas companies of China
Privately held companies of China